Corvers is a surname. Notable people with the surname include:

 Frank Corvers (born 1969), Belgian cyclist
 Kevin Corvers (born 1987), German footballer

See also
 Charles Corver (1936–2020), Dutch football referee